Worldwide ERC (also known as the Employee Relocation Council) is a relocation services industry trade group. Its membership of 12,000 (as of 2005) relocation professionals--or global workforce mobility specialists—are concerned with current issues and management practices for the movement of employees (by their employers) within the United States and between all other countries. The organization is headquartered in Washington, DC,  with a European bureau in Brussels, Belgium.

Programs
Worldwide ERC addresses issues related to public policy/lobbying, research and trend identification, professional certification, networking, training and education, industry standardization and consensus-building, management processes and practices and e-business solutions.

Through training courses, a member of the organization can become accredited as a "Certified Relocation Professional," a "Senior Certified Relocation Professional," and a "Global Mobility Specialist," which entitles the member to include the professional designations CRP, SCRP and/or GMS after his or her name.

Worldwide ERC publishes a monthly magazine, Mobility as well as several Web-based newsletters and bulletins, including Globility.

Research

Annual rankings of U.S. cities
Worldwide ERC's annual Best Cities for Relocating Families and Best Cities for Relocation Singles surveys began ranking U.S. cities in 2003 to determine which metro areas are most likely to foster successful relocations. Success is determined by whether a transferring employee remains in his or her new position and does not quit due to dissatisfaction with the new home community—an expensive failure in HR terms for the employer who paid for the move. A number of measurable features can affect the ease with which a family or single person can move to a city and the ease of settling into a new life there.

Analyzing cities' suitability for newly relocated families
For each year's "Families" survey, traditional factors such as commute times, tax rates, average home cost, and home appreciation are combined with more diverse cost of living and quality of life variables—like the ability to qualify for in-state tuition, the service quality of local utilities, auto taxes, per-capita volunteerism, and the quantity of family-friendly events and venues. Fee and occupancy rates for temporary housing and self storage are also used to predict the ease of a transition to a large city. The quality and availability of elder-care and assisted-living reflects a city’s investment in the needs of modern, multi-generational families.

Analyzing cities' suitability for newly relocated singles (unmarried)
For each "Singles" ranking, the survey considers demographic and economic factors that helps measure the number of unmarried newcomers in each metro area (largest 100 metros only). Newcomers tend to be more open to befriending fellow newcomers, so the cities that tend to attract them foster easier assimilation. The measurement factors include the percentage of singles between the ages of 25-34, recent job growth, recent change in each area's 25-34 age-group, and median age (with "ideal range" set to 25-34). 	 
 
Other, less critical, criteria for singles include gender parity, "fan friendly" sports venues, climate, per-capita volunteerism (a way for the "transitionally shy" to warm up to new acquaintances), on-premises food and beverage spending, availability and pricing of temporary housing and storage, apartment rents, utility customer-service levels, public university residency requirements, and online dating as well as heavy concentrations of Starbucks, other coffee houses, highly rated restaurants, health clubs and nightclubs.

See also
Moving company

Relocation
Moving and relocation